Tatra National Park (abbr. TPN) is a national park located in the Tatra Mountains in Tatra County, in the Lesser Poland Voivodeship—Małopolska region, in central-southern Poland. The park has its headquarters in the town of Zakopane.

The Tatra Mountains form a natural border between Poland to the north and Slovakia to the south, and the two countries have cooperated since the early 20th century on efforts to protect the area. Slovakia created an adjoining national park, and UNESCO later designated the combined effort a transboundary biosphere reserve.

Park history
The first calls for protection of the Tatras came at the end of the 19th century. In 1925 the first efforts to create a national park, in cooperation with Czechoslovakia, took place. Formally the park was created in 1937, on an area that belonged to the state forests authority. In 1947, a separate administrative unit, Tatra Park, was created.

In 1954, by decision of the Polish Government, Tatra National Park was created. Of this,  is forest and the remainder mainly meadows.

In 1992, the Polish and Slovakian national parks in the Tatras were jointly designated a transboundary biosphere reserve by UNESCO, under its Man and the Biosphere Programme.

Geography
Mountains
The National Park covers one of the two Alpine mountain ranges in Poland. The Polish Tatra range, which is a part of the Western Carpathian Mountains, is divided into two sections: the High Tatras (Tatry Wysokie) and the Western Tatras (Tatry Zachodnie). The landscape consists of sharp-edged peaks and hollows with numerous rock formations.  The highest peak in Poland, Rysy ( AMSL), is located here.

Caves
There are around 650 caves in the park, of which the Wielka Sniezna cave system is the longest, and the deepest (maximum depth ). Six caves of this system are open to public.

Water
There are several streams, the longest stream reaching . Waterfalls, such as Wodogrzmoty Mickiewicza are popular with tourists. The highest waterfall is Wielka Siklawa at ).

The park has over 30 mountain lakes, called staw (Polish: pond). These water bodies are an important part of the High Tatra landscape. The largest lakes are: Morskie Oko with an area of 349,000 m2 and maximum depth of ); and Wielki Staw with an area of 344,000 m2 and maximum depth of ).

Biology and ecology

Flora
Up to  there are mainly silver fir (Abies alba) and European beech (Fagus sylvatica) forests. The highest elevations, above , have alpine flora habitats.

Other typical species include Swiss pine (Pinus cembra), edelweiss (Leontopodium alpinum), and stemless carline thistle (Carlina acaulis). Spring in the Kościeliska Valley is notable for the fields of giant crocus (Crocus vernus, syn: Crocus scepusiensis).

Fauna

The National Park contains several endemic fauna species, and many endangered and protected ones. Animals include: the Tatra chamois and Alpine marmot, both protected since the mid-19th century; brown bear, Eurasian lynx, gray wolf, European otter and the lesser spotted eagle.

Culture

The Górale
The Podhale region of the Tatras is home to the Górales or the Goral (highland) people. Distinctive elements of their culture include the Podhale dialect (language), music, and traditional artisan customs such as clothes, wooden vernacular architecture, cheesemaking, and craft works. The historic Górale culture was traditionally passed on in oral stories.

Environment
The area of the Tatra mountains was exploited by human activities in the past. During summer numerous herds of animals (such as goats, sheep, and cows) pastured on the meadows and these practices caused erosion processes. In the 18th and 19th centuries several mines and ironworks were built here, industries that used substantial harvests of local timber.

Current environmental threats include: the proximity of the fast-developing town of Zakopane; and air pollution from the industrial zones in Kraków, Ostrava, and Orava. Fauna is threatened by poachers and habitat loss.

The high number of tourists is the largest threat to the park's ecosystem currently. Also, the infrastructure, such as hotels and car parks, is not sufficient for the current volume of visitors.

Tourism
Tourism was first developed in the Tatras in the late 19th century, and continues in the 21st. It is the most visited of the national parks in Poland.

Gallery

See also
Tatra National Park, Slovakia — biosphere reserve partner.
Western Carpathians Ranges
List of national parks of Poland

References

External links

Official Tatra National Park website — (English)

National parks of Poland
Biosphere reserves of Poland
Parks in Lesser Poland Voivodeship
Protected areas of the Western Carpathians
Protected areas established in 1954
Tatra County
High Tatras
Western Tatras
Tatra Mountains
1954 establishments in Poland
Ramsar sites in Poland